The Arize is a river of France, a right tributary of the Garonne.

In its first  it is called the Péguère.  It formed the grotto of Le Mas-d'Azil.

References

External links
 Kayak information on the Arize 
Ariege

Arize
Arize
Rivers of Ariège (department)
Rivers of Occitania (administrative region)